Enzo Brentegani (born 18 March 1948) is a retired Italian racing cyclist. He rode in two editions of the Giro d'Italia in his career, finishing 81st in 1973 and pulling out after the third stage in 1974.

Major results
Sources:
1971
 1st Trofeo Città di San Vendemiano
 3rd Trofeo Alcide Degasperi
1972
 5th Overall Tour de l'Avenir

Grand Tour general classification results timeline

References

External links
 

1948 births
Living people
Italian male cyclists